Umulan Man o Umaraw (International title: Seasons of Love / ) is a 2000 Philippine television drama romance series broadcast by GMA Network. The series is the third installment of GMA Mini-Series. Directed by Louie Ignacio, it stars Angelika Dela Cruz, KC Montero and Sunshine Dizon. It premiered on June 5, 2000 replacing Tago Ka Na!. The series concluded on August 28, 2000. It was replaced by Munting Anghel in its timeslot.

Cast and characters
Lead cast
 Angelika Dela Cruz as Andrea
 Sunshine Dizon as Rebecca
 KC Montero as Jason

Supporting cast
 Wowie de Guzman as Manuel
 Eddie Gutierrez as Rafael
 Ali Sotto as Karina
 Amy Austria as Chona
 Gabby Eigenmann as Nick
 Trina Zuñiga as Arlene

Guest cast
 Evangeline Pascual as Sylvana
 Anna Marin as Rhodora
 Sheila Mercado as Angie
 Ryan Serrano as Mike

References

2000 Philippine television series debuts
2000 Philippine television series endings
Filipino-language television shows
GMA Network drama series
Philippine romance television series
Television shows set in the Philippines